An aerobatic aircraft is an aerodyne (a heavier-than-air aircraft) used in aerobatics, both for flight exhibitions and aerobatic competitions.

Most fall into one of two categories, aircraft used for training and by flight demonstration teams, which are often standard trainers or fighters, and aircraft especially designed for aerobatics, usually at the expense of other attributes, such as stability, carrying passengers or endurance. Dates are of first flight.

Powered aircraft

Australia
 Victa/AESL Airtourer (1959)

Belgium

 Renard R.34 (1934) 
 Stampe SV.4 (1933) 
 Tipsy Nipper (Homebuilt - 1957)

Brazil
 
 Embraer EMB 312 Tucano (operated by the Esquadrilha da Fumaça) (1980)
 Embraer EMB 314 Super Tucano (operated by the Esquadrilha da Fumaça) (2012)
 Instituto de Pesquisas Tecnologicas IPT-16 Surubim (1959)
 Neiva Universal (operated by the Esquadrilha da Fumaça) (1966)
 ACS-100 Sora (2008)
 CEA-309 Mehari (2009)
 Wega 180 (2013)
 CEA-311 Anequim (2014)

Canada

 Acrolite Aircraft Acrolite (Homebuilt - 1986)
 Canadair Sabre (operated by the Golden Hawks) (1950)(Fighter)
 Canadair CT-114 Tutor (operated by the Snowbirds) (1960)
 Canadair CT-133 Silver Star (operated by the Red Knight) (1952)
 de Havilland Canada DHC-1 Chipmunk (1946)
 Raven 2XS (Homebuilt - 2009) 
 Ultimate Aircraft 10 Dash (1985)
 Ultimate 10-180 (1990s homebuilt)
 Ultimate 10-200 (1990s homebuilt)
 Ultimate 10-300 (1990s homebuilt Biplane)
 Zenith CH 150 Acro Zenith (Homebuilt - 1980)

Chile
 ENAER T-35 Pillán (1981)

China
 Chengdu J-7 (flown by the August 1st) (1966)
 Chengdu J-10 (flown by the August 1st) (1998)
 Hongdu JL-8 (1990)
 Nanchang CJ-6 (1958) 
 Shenyang J-5 (flown by the August 1st) (1956)

Czechoslovakia/Czech Republic

 Aero L-29A Akrobat (1959) 
 Aero L-39 Albatros (operated by the Patriots Jet Team) (1968)
 Avia BH-10 (1924)
 Avia BH-21 (1925) 
 Avia BH-22 (1925) 
 Avia B.122 (1934) 
 Beneš-Mráz Beta-Scolar (1937)
 Zlín Akrobat
 Zlín Trener Master
 Zlín Z 26 (1947)
 Zlín Z-226
 Zlín Z-326
 Zlín Z-526
 Zlín Z-50 (1975)
 Zlín Z-242L

Denmark

 SAI KZ II Sport (1937) 
 SAI KZ VIII (1949)

France

 Acrobin (= Avions Robin R2160),(1976)
 Bernard S-72 (operated by Antoine Paillard - 1930)
 Blériot XI (first loop in Western Europe in 1913) (1909)
 Dewoitine D.27 (operated by Marcel Doret) (1928)
 Dyn'Aéro CR.100 (Homebuilt - 1992)
 Dyn'Aéro R180 (Homebuilt)
 Fouga CM.170 Magister (operated by the IAF Aerobatic Team) (1952)
 Fouga CM.175 Zéphyr (1959) 
 Fournier RF 4 (1966) 
 Gazuit-Valladeau GV-1020 (1969)

 Gourdou-Leseurre GL B6 & B7 (1918) 
 Morane-Saulnier G (1912)
 Morane-Saulnier MS.180 (1929) 
 Morane-Saulnier M.S.225  (1932)
 Morane-Saulnier MS.230 (operated by the Patrouille d'Étampes) (1929)
 Morane-Saulnier MS.560 (1945) 
 Mudry CAP 10  (1968)
 Mudry CAP 20 (1976)
 Mudry CAP 21 (1979)
 Mudry CAP 222
 Mudry CAP 230 (1997)
 Nieuport IV.G (first loop) (1911)
 Nord 3202B1B (1957)
 Peña Bilouis (Homebuilt - 1991)
 Peña Capeña (Homebuilt - 1984)
 Peña Dahu (Homebuilt - 1996)
 Peña Joker (Homebuilt - 2002)
 Piel Pinocchio II (Homebuilt - 1986)
 Romano R.82 (1936) 
 Scintex Super Emeraude (Homebuilt - 1954)
 Tech Aero TR 200 (Homebuilt - 1988)

France & Germany
 Dassault/Dornier Alpha Jet (operated by the Patrouille de France) (1973)

Germany

 Akaflieg München Mü30 Schlacro (2000)
 Albatros L 79 Kobold (1929)
 Arado Ar 79 (1938)
 BFW M.35 (1933)
 Bücker Bü 131 (1934)
 Bücker Bü 133 (flown by Alexandru Papană) (1935)
 Dietrich DP.II (1923?)
 Extra EA-200 (1996)
 Extra EA-230 (1983)
 Extra EA-300 (operated by the Royal Jordanian Falcons) (1988)
 Fieseler F2 Tiger (1932)
 Fieseler Fi 5 (1933)
 Focke-Wulf S 24 (1928) 
 Focke-Wulf Fw 44 (1932)
 Grob G 120 (1999)
 Hirth Acrostar (1970) 
 Junkers Profly Ultima (1993)
 Klemm Kl 35 (1935)
 MBB 223K-1 Flamingo 
 Mylius My-103 Mistral (1998) 
 Raab-Katzenstein RK-26 (flown by Gerhard Fieseler) (1929)
 Udet U 12 Flamingo (flown by Ernst Udet) (1925) 
 XtremeAir Sbach 300
 XtremeAir Sbach 342

Hungary
 Corvus Racer 540 (2010)
 Genevation GenPro (2018)

India
 Hunter (1982)
 Kiran MkII (1996)
 Advanced Light Helicopter (ALH)

Italy

 Aermacchi SF.260 (operated by the Belgian Diables Rouges) (1964)
 Aermacchi MB-326 (operated by the Silver Falcons & the Roulettes) (1957)
 Aermacchi MB-339 (operated by the Frecce Tricolori) (1976)
 Breda Ba.19 (operated by the Squadriglia di Alta Acrobazia Aerea) (1928)
 CANSA C.5 (1939)
 CANSA C.6 (1941) 
 Caproni Ca.113 (1931)

 Fiat CR.32 (flown by the Pattuglie Acrobatiche) (1933)
 General Avia F.22 (1992)
 IMAM Ro.26 (or Romeo Ro.26) (1932)
 Magni Vale (1937)
 New Avio C205 ultra-light operated by Walter's Bad
 Partenavia Alpha (1972) 
 Piaggio P.148 (1951)
 Sequoia Falco (Homebuilt - 1955)
 Sivel SD28 (1995)
 Terzi T30 Katana (Homebuilt - 1991)

Japan
 Mitsubishi T-2 (1980) - Blue Impulse
 Kawasaki T-4 (1995) - Blue Impulse
 Fuji FA-200 Aero Subaru

New Zealand

 PAC CT/4 Airtrainer  (operated by the RNZAF Red Checkers team) (1972)

Pakistan
 PAC MFI-17 Mushshak (1981)

Poland
 PWS-11 (1929) 
 PWS-35 Ogar (1938) 
 PZL TS-11 Iskra  (1960)
 PZL-130 Orlik (1984) 
 RWD 10 (1933) 
 RWD 17 (1937)

Romania

 IAR 99 Șoim (1985) 
 Yakovlev Yak-52 (Iak-52, 1977, Aerostar Bacau)

Russia/Soviet Union

 Aviatika-900 Acrobat (1993)
 Aeropract A-41 (2016)
 Mikoyan MiG-29 (1977)
 MAI Kvant (1967) 
 Nikitin NV-6 (1940) 
 Sukhoi Su-26 (1988) single-seater
 Sukhoi Su-27 (1977)
 Sukhoi Su-29  (1991)
 Sukhoi Su-31 (1992)
 Technoavia SP-91 Slava
 Technoavia SP-95
 Yakovlev UT-1 (1936) 
 Yakovlev Yak-11 (1946) 
 Yakovlev Yak-18 (1946)
 Yakovlev Yak-20 (1949) 
 Yakovlev Yak-50 (1975) 
 Yakovlev Yak-52 (1976) 
 Yakovlev Yak-53 (1982) 
 Yakovlev Yak-55 (1981) 
 Yakovlev Yak-54 (1993)

South Africa
 Slick Aircraft Slick 360 (2004)

Spain
 CASA C-101 Aviojet(1977)

Sweden
 Andreasson BA-4B (Homebuilt - 1966)
 Saab 105 (operated by Team 60) (1963)

Switzerland
 Pilatus P-3 (operated by the P3 Flyers) (1996)
 Pilatus PC-7 (operated by the PC-7 Team) (1989)
 Pilatus PC-9 (operated by the Blue Phoenix) (1984)
 Pilatus PC-21 (operated by the RAAF Roulettes) (1989)

Taiwan/Republic of China
 AIDC AT-3 Republic of China Air Force Thunder Tiger Aerobatics Team

United Kingdom

 Armstrong Whitworth Siskin (operated by the Siskins) (1921)
 Arrow Active (1931)
 Auster Aiglet Trainer (1951) 
 Avro Avian (1926)
 Avro Cadet (1931)
 BAE Hawk (operated by the Red Arrows) (1974)
 Cranfield A1 Eagle (1976) 
 Currie Wot (Homebuilt - 1937)
 De Havilland Tiger Moth (1931)
 de Havilland Sea Venom 
 de Havilland Sea Vixen (operated by Simon's Sircus) (1951)
 FLS Sprint (1983)
 Folland Gnat  (operated by the Yellowjacks and the Red Arrows) (1955)
 Hawker Hunter (operated by the Black Arrows) (1951)
 Hunting Percival Jet Provost (operated by the Red Pelicans) (1954) 
 Miles Satyr (1932) 
 Slingsby T67 Firefly (1974) 
 Sopwith Scooter (1918) 
 Sopwith Swallow (1918) 
 Southern Martlet (1929) 
 Speedtwin E2E Comet 1 (1991)

United States

 Acro Sport I (Homebuilt - 1972)
 Acro Sport II (Homebuilt)
 Aircraft Technologies Acro 1 (Homebuilt 1993)
 Aircraft Technologies Atlantis (Homebuilt - 1996)
 American Champion Citabria (1964)
 American Champion Decathlon (1970)
 American Champion Super Decathlon (1976)
 Bede BD-8 (Homebuilt - 1980) 
 Beechcraft T-34 Mentor (1948)
 Beechcraft Bonanza (1947) 
 Boeing F2B (1926) 
 Bradley BA-100 Aerobat
 Bradley BA-200 ATAC
 Cessna 150 Aerobat (1957)
 Cessna 152 Aerobat (1977)

 Christen Eagle II/Aviat Eagle II (1977)
 Culp Special
 Curtiss JN-4 (1915)
 Curtiss F7C Seahawk (1927) 
 Curtiss Hawk II (1932)
 Curtiss Gulfhawk (1923)
 D'Apuzzo Senior Aero Sport (Homebuilt - 1962)
 Franklin Demon-1 (Homebuilt)
 Freiberger Ron's 1 (Homebuilt - 1971)
 Giles G-200 (Homebuilt)
 Giles G-202 (Homebuilt)
 Great Lakes Sport Trainer (1929)
 Grumman G-22 Gulfhawk II (1938)
 Hatz Classic (Homebuilt - 1990s)
 Howland H-2A Honey Bee (Homebuilt - 1986)
 Keleher Lark (Homebuilt)
 Kraft Super Fli (Homebuilt - 1974)
 Laser 200 (Homebuilt - 1970)
 McCarley Mini-Mac (Homebuilt - 1970)
 * Merkel Mark II (Homebuilt)
 Monocoupe 110 Special
 Mustang Aeronautics Midget Mustang (Homebuilt - 1948)
 Mustang Aeronautics Mustang II (Homebuilt - 1966)
 
 MX Aircraft MX2 (2002)
 MX Aircraft MXS
 North American P-51 Mustang (1940)
 North American SNJ/T-6 Texan (1935)
 Piper J-3 Cub (Flying farmer act) (1938)
 Piper PA-18 Super Cub (1949)
 Pitts Special (Homebuilt - 1944)
 Pitts Model 12 (Homebuilt - 1996) 

 Rans S-9 Chaos (Homebuilt - 1986) 
 Rans S-10 Sakota (Homebuilt - 1988)
 Rans S-16 Shekari (Homebuilt - 1994)
 Reflex Lightning Bug (Homebuilt - 1990s)
 Rihn DR-107 One Design (homebuilt - 1993) 
 Rihn DR-109 (homebuilt - 1990s) 
 Rose Parakeet (Homebuilt - 1931)
 Rowley P-40F (Homebuilt replica - 1986)
 Rud Aero RA-2 (2012)
 Rud Aero RA-3 (2013)
 Ryan STA (1934)
 Shober Willie II (Homebuilt - 1971)
 SkyDancer SD-260 (Homebuilt - 1990s)
 Skipper Scrappy UAC-200 (Homebuilt - 1970)
 Skyote Aeromarine Skyote (Homebuilt - 1976)
 Sonex Aircraft SubSonex (Homebuilt - 2009)
 Sorrell Hiperbipe (Homebuilt)
 Spinks Akromaster (Homebuilt)
 Sport Flight Talon Typhoon (Homebuilt - 1989)
 Starfire Firebolt (Homebuilt)
 Staudacher S-300 (1990)
 Staudacher S-600 (2010)
 Stearman Model 75 (1934) 
 Steen Skybolt (Homebuilt - 1970)
 Stephens Akro (Homebuilt - 1967)
 Stewart S-51D Mustang (Homebuilt - 1994)
 Stolp Acroduster (Homebuilt)
 Stolp Acroduster Too (Homebuilt)
 Stolp Starduster (Homebuilt)
 Stolp Starduster Too (Homebuilt)
 Stolp SA-900 V-Star (Homebuilt)
 Super Chipmunk (modified de Havilland Canada Chipmunk)

 Terle Sportplane (Homebuilt - 1931)
 Travel Air 2000 (1925) 
 Travel Air 3000 (1928) 
 Travel Air 4000 (1929)
 Van's Aircraft RV-14 (Homebuilt - 2012)
 Viper Aircraft Viperfan (Homebuilt, 1990s)
 Velox Revolution 1 (Homebuilt)
 Waco 10/GXE/ASO/CSO/DSO/ATO/CTO (1927) 
 Waco A series (1932)
 Waco F series (1930) 
 Zivko Edge 540 (1993)

Yugoslavia
 Rogožarski SIM-XI (1938) 
 Soko G-2 Galeb (1961)

Gliders

Bulgaria
 Kometa-Standard glider (1960)

Czechoslovakia
 Letov LF-107 Luňák glider (1948) 
 Let L-13A Blanik
 Let L-13AC Blanik

Germany

 Akaflieg München Mü28 glider (1983) 
 DFS Habicht glider (1936)
 Glaser-Dirks DG-300 Acro glider (1983)
 Glasflügel H-101 glider (1970) 
 Grob G103a Twin II glider (1980?) 
 LCF II glider (1975) 
 Schempp-Hirth Standard Austria glider (1959) 
 Schleicher ASK 21 glider (1979) 
 Vogt Lo-100 glider (1952) 
Glasflügel H101 Salto "Glieder" (1970)

Italy
 Bonomi BS.14 Astore glider (1935) 
 Piana Canova PC.500 glider (1937)

Poland

 Allstar SZD-59 glider (1991) 
 Instytut Szybownictwa IS-4 Jastrząb glider (1949) 
 Marganski Swift S-1 glider (1991) 
 MDM MDM-1 Fox glider (1993) 
 SZD-C Żuraw glider (1952) 
 SZD-21 Kobuz glider (1961) 
 SZD-22 Mucha Standard glider (1958) 
 SZD-24 Foka glider (1960) 
 SZD-32 Foka 5 glider (1966) 
 SZD-50 Puchacz glider (1979)
 Allstar SZD-59 glider (1991)
 Allstar SZD-54 Perkoz glider (2011)

Romania
 ICA IS-28 glider (1970) 
 ICA IS-29 glider (1970) 
 ICA IAR-35 glider (1986)

Soviet Ukraine
 Antonov A-13 glider (1958)

South Africa
 Celair GA-1 Celstar glider (1989)

Sweden
 Radab Windex  glider (1985)

See also

 List of flight demonstration teams
 List of aerobatic teams

References

 
Aerobatic